Operation E is a 2012 Spanish-French-Colombian drama film directed by Miguel Courtois.

The film was inspired by the story of José Crisanto, a Colombian peasant who was sentenced to 33 years in prison after nursing the son of Clara Rojas who was kidnapped by the FARC.

References

External links 

2012 drama films
2012 films
Spanish drama films
French drama films
Colombian drama films
Films directed by Miguel Courtois
2010s French films
2010s Colombian films
2010s Spanish films